Metarctia virgata is a moth of the subfamily Arctiinae. It was described by James John Joicey and George Talbot in 1921. It is found in the Democratic Republic of the Congo and Uganda.

References

 

Metarctia
Moths described in 1921